The 1887 All-Ireland Senior Hurling Championship was the first staging of the All-Ireland hurling championship. The championship began on 2 July 1887 and ended on 1 April 1888.

Tipperary won the title following a 1-1 to 0-0 defeat of Galway in the final.

Background

The Gaelic Athletic Association (GAA), the governing body of Gaelic games in Ireland, had been formed in 1884, but for the first three years of its existence, its member clubs played only friendly matches and locally organised tournaments. In 1887, however, the existing county boards started to organise knock-out championships for the club teams within their own county.  The county club championships were then extended to a national or All-Ireland inter-county series of games.

Teams

All of the existing county boards were eligible to enter a team, however, only six chose to do so.  Disputes in Cork and Limerick over which club should represent the county resulted in neither county fielding a team.

In all five teams participated: Clare (Garraunboy Smith O'Briens), Dublin (Metropolitans) Galway (Meelick), Kilkenny (Tullaroan) Tipperary (Thurles) and Wexford (Castlebridge).

All of the original entrants subsequently went on the claim the All-Ireland title, while all of the participating clubs still exist in some form.

Format

For the only time in its history there were no provincial championships and an open draw was used to determine the pairings in the All-Ireland championship.

All-Ireland Championship

First round: (1 match) This is a lone match between the first two teams paired together.  One team is eliminated at this stage while the winning team advances to the second round.

Second round: (1 match) This is a lone match between the winner of the first round and another team.  One team is eliminated at this stage while the winning team advances to the semi-finals.

Semi-final: (2 matches) The winners of the second round game join the three remaining teams to make up the semi-final pairings.  Two teams are eliminated at this stage while the two winning teams advance to the final.

Final: (1 match) The winners of the two semi-finals contest this game.  The winners are declared All-Ireland champions.

Scoring

A unique scoring system was used in the first championship.  One goal was worth more than any number of points, while "forfeit points" (5 forfeit points = 1 point) were awarded in place of 65's. Scores here are given in the form goals-points-forfeit points, e.g. 2-4-1. So (for example), 2-0-0 defeats 1-7-2 (goal outvalues any number of points); 1-3-4 defeats 1-2-7 (3.8 points vs. 3.4 points); 3-0-6 defeats 3-1-0 (six forfeit points outvalue one point).  Similarly, the playing pitch was significantly larger than the modern day pitch, particularly in width, and teams had twenty-one players.  The scoring area was exactly similar to the scoring area used in the International rules football games.

Fixtures

All-Ireland Senior Hurling Championship

Championship statistics

Miscellaneous

 Tipperary receive a walkover in their opening game against Dublin.  The Dublin champions, Metropolitans, sought a postponement of the game from the GAA's Executive because some of their players were on holidays.  The request was refused.

Sources

 Corry, Eoghan, The GAA Book of Lists (Hodder Headline Ireland, 2005).
 Donegan, Des, The Complete Handbook of Gaelic Games (DBA Publications Limited, 2005).

External links
 1887 All-Ireland Senior Hurling Championship results

References

1887